The following article is a summary of the 2018 Indonesia national football team results.

Men's football team

Record

Goalscorers

Managers of 2018

Fixtures and results

Friendly matches

2018 AFF Championship

Group B

Men's under-23 football team

Managers of 2018
Includes just against country

Goal scorers

Record

Fixtures and results

Friendly Matches

International Friendly

Non International Friendly

2018 PSSI Anniversary Cup

Football at the 2018 Asian Games – Men's tournament

Men's national under-19 football team

Managers of 2018
Includes just against country

Goal scorers

Record



Frienday

International Frienday

Non-International Frienday

2018 AFF U-19 Youth Championship

Knockout stage

2018 AFC U-19 Championship

Knockout stage

Men's under-16 Football Team

Managers of 2018
Includes just against country

Goal scorers

Record

Fixtures and results

Friendlies

International Friendlies

Non-International Friendlies

2018 JENESYS Tournament

Knockout phase

2018 AFF U-16 Youth Championship

Knockout stage

2018 AFC U-16 Championship

Knockout stage

Women's Football Team

Record

Goalscorers

Managers of 2018

Fixtures and results

Friendlies

International Friendlies

2018 AFF Women's Championship

2018 Asian Games

Women's under-16 Football Team

Record

Goalscorers

Managers of 2018

References

Indonesia
2018